"A Love That Will Never Grow Old" is a song from the film Brokeback Mountain. Its music was composed by Argentine composer Gustavo Santaolalla, with lyrics by Bernie Taupin, and performed by singer Emmylou Harris. It won the 2005 Golden Globe Award for Best Original Song, the Satellite Award and the Internet Movie Award for Best Original Song. The song was nominated at the World Soundtrack Awards for Best Original Song Written Directly for a Film but was controversially deemed ineligible for Academy Award consideration owing to its insufficient air time in the movie. It is available on the film soundtrack.

Reception
Thom Jurek from Allmusic described the song as "simple, spare, and poignant", and marked it as a highlight from the film soundtrack.

References

2005 songs
Best Original Song Golden Globe winning songs
Brokeback Mountain
Emmylou Harris songs
LGBT-related songs
Songs written for films
Songs with lyrics by Bernie Taupin
Songs written by Gustavo Santaolalla
Verve Forecast Records singles